Russian Federation participated at the I European Games, which took place in Baku, Azerbaijan from 12 to 28 June 2015. Russia sent athletes for every sport except athletics, as the level of Russian athletes was too high, according to Russia's Minister of Sports Vitaly Mutko. Russia still had the largest team at the Games, with the athletics programme consisting of only one event. Russia finished in the first place on the medal rankings, winning 79 gold medals.

Team 
Russia sent around 620 athletes, coaches, managers, physicians and masseurs. At an executive committee meeting of the Russian Olympic Committee on 21 May, the number of participants was named 367 athletes, 317 of which represent Olympic sports, 40 non-Olympic sports, seven demonstration sports and three Paralympic sports. The final number of athletes was 351 (excluding athletes who competed at the demonstration or Paralympics sports).

Most athletes came from Moscow (97). Also many sportspeople represented the Moscow Oblast (38), St. Petersburg (33), Republic of Tatarstan (17) and Krasnodar Krai (16). Russian athletes competed at all sport types, except athletics, as the level of the Russian team would have been too high, according to Vitaly Mutko. The introduction of the team took place on 3 June 2015 at the sports center Ozero Krugloe. The uniform was made by the Russian company Bosco di Ciliegi.

The flag bearer on the opening ceremony on 12 June 2015 became Olympic Champion, multifold World and European Champion in Wrestling, Khadzhimurat Gatsalov. President of Russia Vladimir Putin attended the opening ceremony. The flag of the European Olympic Committee was held by manifold Gymnastics Champion Elena Zamolodchikova together with seven other people.

The manager of the Russian delegation was Igor Kazikov.

Competitors

Medalists

Archery

Athletics

Russia did not send sportspeople for this sports event.

Badminton

Basketball 3x3

Team roster

Men
Ilia Aleksandrov
Andrey Kanygin
Leopold Lagutin
Alexsandr Pavlov

Women
Mariia Cherepanova
Anna Leshkovtseva
Tatiana Petrushina
Tatiana Vidmer

Summary

Beach soccer

Russia could compete at the European Games as she made it to the 2014 Euro Beach Soccer League Superfinal.

Semifinals

Final

Boxing

Russia has qualified 15 boxers.

Men

Women

Canoe sprint

Russia has qualified 19 athletes.

Men

Women

Qualification Legend: FA = Qualify to final (medal); FB = Qualify to final B (non-medal)

Cycling

Road
Russia has qualified 11 athletes.

Men

Women

Mountain biking
Russia has qualified one athlete.

BMX
Russia has qualified four athletes.

Diving

Russia has qualified 19 athletes.

Men

Women

Fencing

Russia has qualified 24 fencers.
Men

Women

Gymnastics

Acrobatic
Women's groups

Mixed pairs

Aerobic
Russia has a total of six athletes after the performance at the 2013 Aerobic Gymnastics European Championships. One gymnast from pairs must compete in the group, making the total athletes to 6.
 Pairs – 1 pair of 2 athletes
 Groups – 1 team of 5 athletes

Artistic
Men's – 3 quota places
Women's – 3 quota places

Men
Team

Individual finals

Women
Team

Individual finals

Rhythmic
Russia has qualified one athlete after the performance at the 2013 Rhythmic Gymnastics European Championships.
 Individual – 2 quota places

Individual

Group

Trampoline
Russia qualified two athletes based on the results at the 2014 European Trampoline Championships. The gymnasts competed in both the individual and the synchronized event.
 Men's – 2 quota places
 Women's – 2 quota places

Judo

Russia has qualified 20 athletes.

Men

Women

Karate

Kumite

Sambo

Russia sent eight athletes for the sambo event.

Men

Women

Shooting

Men

Women

Mixed team

Swimming

Russia has qualified 35 athletes.
Men

Women

Mixed

Synchronised swimming

Table tennis

Russia has qualified six athletes for the table tennis events.

Taekwondo 

Russia has qualified eight athletes.

Triathlon

Volleyball

Beach

Indoor
Summary

Water polo

Summary

Men's tournament
Preliminary round

Playoff

Quarterfinal

5–8th place semifinal

Fifth place game

Women's tournament
Preliminary round

Semifinal

Final

Wrestling

Men's freestyle

Men's Greco-Roman

Women's freestyle

References

Nations at the 2015 European Games
European Games
2015